Poppy Colette Corby-Tuech (born 1987) is a British actress. She is known for portraying Prudence in the E! soap opera The Royals, and for her role as Vinda Rosier in Fantastic Beasts.

Early life
Corby-Tuech was born to Michel Corby-Tuech of Veneux-les-Sablons, France, and Catherine, daughter of Lieutenant-Colonel Gillachrist Campbell of the Royal Artillery. Her mother descends from Sholto Douglas, 19th Earl of Morton, the Lords Belhaven and Stenton, and Earls of Albemarle.

Career
Corby-Tuech was a member of the English Post-punk/electro band White Rose Movement from 2008 until 2010.

In 2017, she acted in the music video of the song "Ready to Go" by the English synth-pop duo Hurts.

Select filmography

Film

Television

References

Further reading 
Interview at Harper's Bazaar, April 2017
Interview at  Square Mile, March 2022

External links

 White Rose Movement at Last.fm

Living people
21st-century French actresses
1987 births